Frank Zöllner (born 26 June 1956) is a German art historian who has been a professor of art history at Leipzig University since 1996. He is a prolific scholar on the life and works of Leonardo da Vinci,  and author of one of the two modern catalogue raisonné of Leonardo's works (the other being by Pietro C. Marani).

Biography 
Zöllner studied the history of art from 1977 to 1981. From 1983-1985, he was an 'Aby Warburg Fellow' at the Warburg Institute, in London. After his 1987 graduation took place at the University of Hamburg he worked from 1988 to 1992 as a research assistant at the Bibliotheca Hertziana in Rome.

Zöllner has since 1996 been a professor of medieval and modern art history at Leipzig University.

Honors and awards 
 Leipzig Science Award of Saxon Academy of Sciences (2009)
 2013 Member of the Saxon Academy of Sciences

Publications 
 Vitruvs Proportionsfigur. Quellenkritische Studien zur Kunstliteratur des 15. und 16. Jahrhunderts. Worms 1987.
 Leonardo's Portrait of Mona Lisa del Giocondo Gazette des Beaux-Arts 121(S.)115–138. 1993 DOI 10.11588/artdok.00004207 ISSN 0016-5530 
 Leonardo da Vinci. Mona Lisa. Das Porträt der Lisa del Giocondo. Legende und Geschichte. Frankfurt 1994. (feat.). 
 La Battaglia di Anghiari di Leonardo da Vinci fra mitologia e politica. Lettura Vinciana 1997. Text [summary]
 Bilder des Frühlings und der Liebe: Die mythologischen Gemälde Sandro Botticellis. Munich/New York 1998.    
 Leonardo da Vinci. Benedikt Taschen Verlag Cologne 1999.   
 Michelangelos Fresken in der Sixtinischen Kapelle. Gesehen von Giorgio Vasari und Ascanio Condivi. Freiburg im Breisgau 2002 (Rombach Wissenschaften, Quellen zur Kunst, Bd. 17).    
 Leonardo da Vinci. The Complete Paintings and Drawings. Cologne 2003.    
 Papierpaläste. Illustrierte Architekturtheorie des 15. bis 18. Jahrhunderts. Katalog zur Ausstellung vom 16. März bis 14. Mai 2005 in der Universitätsbibliothek Albertina (Schriften aus der Universitätsbibliothek, 9), Leipzig 2005.    
 Sandro Botticelli. Munich 2005 [German]; 2005 [English], 2nd edn. 2015.
 "Speicher der Erinnerung". Die mittelalterlichen Ausstattungsstücke der Leipziger Universitätskirche St. Pauli, 2005 [editor].
 Leonardos Mona Lisa. Vom Porträt zur Ikone der Freien Welt (Wagenbachs Taschenbuch Band 552). Verlag Klaus Wagenbach, Berlin 2006, 
 Georg Wünschmann (1868–1937). Ein Leipziger Architekt und die Pluralität der Stile, Leipzig 2006 [editor].
 Michelangelo – Das vollständige Werk. (zusammen mit Christof Thönes und Thomas Pöpper), Cologne 2007
 Griffelkunst. Mythos, Traum und Liebe in Max Klingers Grafik. Plöttner Verlag, Leipzig 2007, 
 Bewegung und Ausdruck bei Leonardo da Vinci. Plöttner Verlag, Leipzig 2009, 
 Tübke Stiftung Leipzig. Bestandskatalog der Zeichnungen und Aquarelle. Plöttner Verlag, Leipzig 2009, [editor] 
on Salvator Mundi (Leonardo), 2013

See also
The Lost Leonardo, 2021 film in which Zöllner is interviewed

External links 
 What the satyrs taught. - The Time # 31, July 29, 2010
  Neo Rauch Understand: With tighter Wade. - The Time # 22, May 26, 2011

Living people
Writers from Bremen
1956 births
German art historians
German male non-fiction writers
Leonardo da Vinci scholars